2002 J.League Cup Final was the 10th final of the J.League Cup competition. The final was played at National Stadium in Tokyo on November 4, 2002. Kashima Antlers won the championship.

Match details

See also
2002 J.League Cup

References

J.League Cup
2002 in Japanese football
Kashima Antlers matches
Urawa Red Diamonds matches